Franklin Field is a stadium at the University of Pennsylvania.

Franklin Field may also refer to:


Airports
 Franklin Field (Alabama) (FAA: 07A), an airport in Union Springs, Alabama, United States
 Franklin Field (California) (FAA: F72), an airport in Franklin, California, United States
 Franklin Flying Field (FAA: 3FK), an airport in Franklin, Indiana, United States

Parks
 Franklin Field (Massachusetts), the former name of Harambee Park in Boston
 Franklin Field (Wisconsin), a ballpark in Franklin, Wisconsin, United States

Other uses
 Elgin–Franklin fields, a complex of oil and gas fields in the North Sea

See also
 Frank Field (disambiguation)
 Franklin County Airport (disambiguation)